Chascomús is the principal city in Chascomús Partido in eastern Buenos Aires Province of Argentina, located  south of the capital Buenos Aires. In 2001, the city had a population of 30,670.

History
The city was founded as a fort (the Fortín de San Juan Bautista) on May 30, 1779, by Captain Pedro Nicolás Escribano, head of the Blandengues Cavalry. The city was the site of an 1839 rebellion against the dictatorial regime of Governor Juan Manuel de Rosas; the uprising, known as the Libres del Sur ("Freemen of the South") ended in defeat following a battle on November 7. The Buenos Aires Great Southern Railway line arrived at the town in 1865, and Chascomús was recognized as a city and department by the Provincial Legislature in 1873.

Notable residents
Former Argentine President Raúl Alfonsín and his wife, former First Lady María Lorenza Barreneche, and their son Ricardo Alfonsín were all born in the city. Other natives include the interim military President Alfredo Oscar Saint Jean, professional tennis player Carlos Berlocq, 2020 world champion of poker Damian Salas, as well as the cyclists Juan José Haedo and Lucas Sebastián Haedo.

Gallery

References

External links

Municipal website 

 
Populated places in Buenos Aires Province
Populated places established in 1779